The Lu River is a right-bank tributary of the Xiang River. The Lu River is one of the largest tributaries of the Xiang. The main stream passes through the counties of Yuanzhou, Shangli, Anyuan and Xiangdong in Jiangxi and the counties of Liling and Zhuzhou in Hunan.

References

Rivers of Jiangxi
Rivers of Hunan